Talan may refer to:

People
 Deb Talan (born 1968), American singer-songwriter
 Jeffrey Talan (born 1971), Dutch football player
 Raúl Talán (1907–1992), Mexican boxer
 Rick Talan (1960–2015), Dutch football player
 Roman Talan (born 1988), Ukrainian pair skater
 Scott Talan, American professor
 Talan Skeels-Piggins (born 1970), British alpine skier

Places
 Talan Island, part of the Spafaryev Islands
 Talan Towers, Kazakhstan

See also